Elena "Ellie" Sian Rayer (born 22 November 1996) is an English international field hockey player who plays as a midfielder or forward for England and Great Britain.

Rayer plays club hockey in the Women's England Hockey League Premier Division for East Grinstead.

References

External links
 
 
 
 
 

1996 births
Living people
English female field hockey players
Female field hockey forwards
East Grinstead Hockey Club players
Women's England Hockey League players
Field hockey players at the 2020 Summer Olympics
Olympic field hockey players of Great Britain
Olympic bronze medallists for Great Britain
Olympic medalists in field hockey
Medalists at the 2020 Summer Olympics
Commonwealth Games medallists in field hockey
Commonwealth Games bronze medallists for England
Field hockey players at the 2018 Commonwealth Games
Sportspeople from Slough
People educated at Claires Court School
Medallists at the 2018 Commonwealth Games